San Luis is a municipality in the El Petén department of Guatemala.   The municipality is rectangle-shaped and is approximately 2,915 km squared.  It contains 44,903 people. There are about 140 hamlets that inhabit the municipality, with the capital of the pueblo of San Luis, itself.

Overview
Its economy is primarily of agriculture, but also contains minor manufacturing services like personalised furniture and custom building services.  The pueblo itself consists of several neighbourhoods, including El Centro, Tikajal, Bethel, Vista Hermosa, La Florida, El Estadio, La Cruce and El Paraiso.  It contains a public school in every neighbourhood and is home to a few private schools, including Centro Maya Asuncion, a school for Mayan teenaged adolescent females from remote villages.  It is administered by Jesus Claros Aliaraza and the Catholic community is represented by the Comboni Missionaries.  Though it is surrounded by steep, hilly forests, deforestation remains the chief problem of the degradation of the surrounding environment.

Languages spoken in San Luis include Spanish, Q’eqchi’, and Mopan Maya.

External links

San Luis municipal website
Coat of arms of San Luis

Municipalities of the Petén Department